Ewert is both a surname and a given name. Notable people with the name include:

Surname
Adolph W. Ewert (born 1865), American politician in the state of South Dakota
Taylor Ewert (born 2001), American Track and Field runner
Arthur Ewert (1890–1959), German Communist activist and Comintern functionary
Craig Ewert, subject of the 2008 documentary Right to Die?
Fritz Ewert (1937–1990), German football player
Jacob Ewert (1874–1923), American socialist and pacifist
Jörg-Peter Ewert (born 1938), German neurophysiologist and neuroethologist
Keith Ewert (1918–1989), Australian politician
Marcus Ewert (born 1972), American writer, actor and director
Maximilian C. Jehuda Ewert (born 1974), German composer and violinist
Rebecca Ewert (born 1955), New Zealand diver
Renate Ewert (1933–1966), German actress
Wolf Ewert (1905–1994), German general

Given name
Ewert Bengtsson, 2015 Fellow of the IEEE
Ewert Janssen (died c. 1692), Danish architect who became a royal masterbuilder in 1668
Ewert Karlsson (1918–2004), Swedish artist and political cartoonist

See also
Errin Ewerts (born 1988), South African cricketer
Ewart, both a given name and a surname
Ferdinand Ewert Building, a historic row house in Davenport, Iowa
Ewert and The Two Dragons, an Estonian indie-rock band